Zobellella maritima is a Gram-negative, aerobic, rod-shaped and motile bacterium from the genus of Zobellella which has been isolated from the beach of Sinduri in Korea. Zobellella maritima is able to degrade polycyclic aromatic hydrocarbons.

References 

Aeromonadales
Bacteria described in 2018